Rowland Stephenson may refer to:

Rowland Stephenson (banker) (1782–1856), British politician
Rowland Stephenson (Carlisle MP) (??–1807), English politician
Rowland Macdonald Stephenson (1808–1895), British engineer